Heinz Schlauch (13 November 1915 in Gera – 21 February 1945 in Niederrhein) was a German swimmer who competed in the 1936 Summer Olympics. He won the 100 m backstroke at the 1938 European Championships in London. He was killed in action during World War II.

References

1915 births
1945 deaths
German male swimmers
Male backstroke swimmers
Olympic swimmers of Germany
Swimmers at the 1936 Summer Olympics
European Aquatics Championships medalists in swimming
German military personnel killed in World War II
Sportspeople from Gera
20th-century German people